The Xia dynasty  is the first dynasty in traditional Chinese historiography. According to tradition, the Xia dynasty was established by the legendary Yu the Great, after Shun, the last of the Five Emperors, gave the throne to him. In traditional historiography, the Xia was later succeeded by the Shang dynasty.

There are no contemporaneous records of the Xia, who are not mentioned in the oldest Chinese texts, since the earliest oracle bone inscriptions date from the late Shang period (13th century BC). The earliest mentions occur in the oldest chapters of the Book of Documents, which report speeches from the early Western Zhou period and are accepted by most scholars as dating from that time. The speeches justify the Zhou conquest of the Shang as the passing of the Mandate of Heaven and liken it to the succession of the Xia by the Shang. That political philosophy was promoted by the Confucian school in the Eastern Zhou period. The succession of dynasties was incorporated into the Bamboo Annals and the Records of the Grand Historian and became the official position of imperial historiography and ideology. Some scholars consider the Xia dynasty legendary or at least unsubstantiated, but others identify it with the archaeological Erlitou culture.

According to the traditional chronology, based upon calculations by Liu Xin, the Xia ruled between 2205 and 1766 BC. According to the chronology based on the "current text" Bamboo Annals, it ruled between 1989 and 1558 BC. Comparing the same text with dates of five-planet conjunctions, David Pankenier, supported by David Nivison, proposed dates of 1953 and 1555 BC. The Xia–Shang–Zhou Chronology Project, commissioned by the Chinese government in 1996, concluded that the Xia existed between 2070 and 1600 BC.

Traditional accounts

The Xia dynasty was described in classic texts such as the Classic of History (Shujing), the Bamboo Annals, and the Records of the Grand Historian (Shiji) by Sima Qian.  According to tradition, the resident Huaxia were the ancestral people of the Han Chinese.

Origins and early development
Traditional histories trace the development of the Xia to the mythical Three Sovereigns and Five Emperors. According to ancient Chinese texts, before the Xia dynasty was established, battles were frequent between Yellow Emperor's tribe and Chi You's tribe. The Records of the Grand Historian and the Classic of Rites say that Yu the Great, the founder of the Xia dynasty, was the grandson of Zhuanxu, who was the grandson of the Yellow Emperor. But there are also other records, like Ban Gu's, that say Yu's father is a fifth generation descendant of Zhuanxu. Other sources such as Shan Hai Jing mention Yu's father Gun was the son of Luoming, who was the son of Huangdi. Sima Qian traced the origin of the dynastic Xia to the name of a fief granted to Yu, who would use it as his own surname and his state's name.

Gun's attempt to stop the flood

Gun, the father of Yu the Great, is the earliest recorded member of the Xia clan. When the Yellow River flooded, many tribes united together to control and stop the flooding. Gun was appointed by Emperor Yao to stop the flooding. He ordered the construction of large blockades (levees) to block the path of the water. The attempts of Gun to stop the flooding lasted for nine years, but ultimately failed because the floods strengthened. After nine years, Yao had already given his throne to Shun. Gun was ordered to be imprisoned for life by Shun at Yushan (Feather Mountain), a mountain located between modern Donghai County in Jiangsu Province and Linshu County in Shandong Province.

Yu the Great's attempt to stop the floods

Yu was highly trusted by Shun, so Shun appointed him to finish his father's work, which was to stop the flooding.  Yu's method was different from his father's: he organized people from different tribes and ordered them to help him build canals in all the major rivers that were flooding and lead the water out to the sea. Yu was dedicated to his work. The populace praised his perseverance and were inspired, so much so that other tribes joined in the work. Legend says that in the 13 years it took him to successfully complete the work to stop the floods, he never went back to his home village to stop and rest, even though he passed by his house three times.

Establishment
Yu's success in stopping the flooding increased agricultural production (since the floods were destructive). The Xia tribe's power increased and Yu became the leader of the surrounding tribes. Soon afterwards Shun sent Yu to lead an army to suppress the Sanmiao tribe, which continuously abused the border tribes. After defeating them, he exiled them south to the Han River area. This victory strengthened the Xia tribe's power even more. As Shun aged, he thought of a successor and relinquished the throne to Yu, whom he deemed worthy. Yu's succession marks the start of the Xia dynasty. As Yu neared death he passed the throne to his son, Qi, instead of passing it to the most capable candidate, thus setting the precedent for dynastic rule or the Hereditary System. The Xia dynasty began a period of family or clan control. It is believed that Zhenxun (modern Gongyi) and Yangcheng (modern Gaocheng) were two of the capitals of the dynasty.

Overthrow
Jie, the last king, was said to be immoral, lascivious, and tyrannical. He was overthrown by Tang, the first king of the Shang dynasty.
Tang is said to have given the small state of Qi as a fief to the remnants of the Xia ruling family.
This practice was referred to as "the two crownings and the three respects".

Zengzi was a descendant of the Xia dynasty Kings through Shao Kang.

The Kings of the State of Yue claimed descent from the Xia dynasty Kings through Shao Kang.

Modern studies 

The time gap between the supposed time of the Xia and the first written references to it have meant that the historicity of the Xia dynasty itself and the traditional narrative of its history are at best uncertain. The Skeptical School of early Chinese history, started by Gu Jiegang in the 1920s, was the first group of scholars within China to systematically question the traditional story of its early history. By critically examining the development of the narrative of early Chinese history throughout history, Gu concluded "the later the time, the longer the legendary period of earlier history... early Chinese history is a tale told and retold for generations, during which new elements were added to the front end".

Some historians have suggested that the Zhou rulers invented the Xia as a pretext, to justify their conquest of the Shang, by noting that just as the Shang had supplanted the Xia, they had supplanted the Shang. The existence of the Xia remains unproven, despite efforts by Chinese archaeologists to link them with the Bronze Age Erlitou culture.

Among other points, Gu and other historians note certain parallels between the traditional narrative of Xia history and Shang history that would suggest probable Zhou-era fabrication or at least embellishment of Xia history. Yun Kuen Lee's criticism of nationalist sentiment in developing an explanation of Three Dynasties chronology focuses on the dichotomy of evidence provided by archaeological versus historical research, in particular, the claim that the archaeological Erlitou culture is also the historical Xia dynasty. "How to fuse the archaeological dates with historical dates is a challenge to all chronological studies of early civilization."

In The Shape of the Turtle: Myth, Art, and Cosmos in Early China, Sarah Allan noted that many aspects of the Xia are simply the opposite of traits held to be emblematic of the Shang.  The implied dualism of the Shang myth system, Allan argues, is that while the Shang represent the suns, sky, birds, east and life, the Xia represent the moons, watery underworld, dragons, west and death.  Allan argues that this mythical Xia was re-interpreted by the Zhou as a ruling dynasty replaced by the Shang, a parallel with their own replacement of the Shang.

Other scholars also argue that Shang political class's remnants still existed during the early Zhou dynasty, Zhou rulers couldn't simply justify their succession to pacify Shang remnants if it's entirely fabricated since the Shang remnants, who remembered prior histories, wouldn't believe it in the first place. For example, the Classic of Poetry preserves the "Eulogies of Shang" (商頌 Shāng sòng) which represents the powerful State of Song, whose rulers were the direct descendants of Shang dynasty. Among those eulogies, the eulogy Chang Fa (長發) celebrated victories by the "Martial King" Tang of Shang against Wei (韋), Gu (顧), Kunwu (昆吾), and Jie of Xia. During the later Song dynasty (960–1279 AD), an ancient bronze artifact, "Shu Yi Zhong" (叔夷鐘), was unearthed with an inscription describing how the founder of the Shang dynasty, Tang, overthrew the Xia dynasty. The owner of this artifact, Shu Yi, a high officer of the Qi Kingdom during the Spring and Autumn period (c. 600 BC), was actually a direct descendant of the Song rulers, which means he himself was a descendant of Shang people. This bronze artifact was used to memorialize his Shang ancestors. The inscription contradicts the hypothesis that the Zhou dynasty manufactured the existence of the Xia dynasty.

Although the Shang oracle bone inscriptions contain no mention of the Xia, some scholars have suggested that polities they mention might be remnants of the Xia.
Guo Moruo suggested that an enemy state called Tufang state of the Fang states mentioned in many inscriptions might be identified with the Xia.
The historian Shen Changyun pointed to four inscriptions mentioning Qǐ (杞), the same name as the state of Qǐ, which according to traditional accounts was established by the defeated royal house of Xia.

Archaeological discoveries

Archaeologists have uncovered urban sites, bronze implements, and tombs that point to the possible existence of the Xia dynasty at locations cited in ancient Chinese historical texts. There exists a debate as to whether or not the Erlitou culture was the site of the Xia dynasty, largely centering on whether archeological evidence of urban habitation across the region before the Shang dynasty should be taken as corroboration of the traditional account of a Xia, or expected regardless of the historicity of the Xia due to the trajectory of population growth and agricultural development in the fertile regions of eastern China from the neolithic through early history. Radiocarbon dating places the Erlitou sites at c. 2100 to 1800 BC, providing physical evidence of the existence of a state contemporaneous with and possibly equivalent to the Xia dynasty as described in later classical Chinese historical works.  In 1959, a site located in the city of Yanshi was excavated containing large palaces that some archaeologists have claimed to be the capital of the Xia dynasty.  Through the 1960s and 1970s, archaeologists have uncovered urban sites, bronze implements, and tombs in the same locations cited in ancient Chinese historical texts regarding Xia; in 2011, Chinese archaeologists uncovered the remains of an imperial sized palace—dated to about 1700 BC—at Erlitou in Henan, further fueling the discussions about the existence of the dynasty. At a minimum, the era traditionally denoted as the Xia dynasty marked a period of urbanization and agricultural development bridging the late Neolithic cultures and the urban civilization of the Shang dynasty.

Archaeological evidence of a large outburst flood at Jishi Gorge that destroyed the Lajia site on the upper reaches of the Yellow River has been dated to about 1920 BC. This date is shortly before the rise of the Erlitou culture in the middle Yellow River valley and the Yueshi culture in Shandong, following the decline of the Longshan culture in the North China Plain. The authors suggest that this flood may have been the basis for the later myth of Yu the Great, and contributed to the cultural transition into the Erlitou period. They further argue that the timing is further evidence for the identification of the Xia with the Erlitou culture.
However, no evidence of contemporaneous widespread flooding in the North China Plain has yet been found.

The only musical instruments dated to the Xia dynasty are two qing, two small bells (one earthenware, one bronze) and a xun. Due to this extreme scarcity of surviving instruments and the general uncertainty surrounding most of the Xia, creating a musical narrative of the period is impractical.

Sovereigns of the Xia dynasty
The following table lists the rulers of Xia according to Sima Qian's Shiji.  Unlike Sima's list of Shang dynasty kings, which is closely matched by inscriptions on oracle bones from late in that period, records of Xia rulers have not yet been found in archaeological excavations of contemporary sites, or records on later Shang dynasty oracle bones.

Xia dynasty family tree

See also

Erlitou culture
List of Neolithic cultures of China
Longshan culture
Baodun culture
Shijiahe culture
Yueshi culture

References

Citations

Sources

External links 

 Stunning Capital of Xia Dynasty Unearthed
 
 

 
 

 
Dynasties in Chinese history
Former countries in Chinese history
States and territories established in the 3rd millennium BC
States and territories disestablished in the 16th century BC